Slađan Spasić (born 15 June 1973) is a retired Serbian footballer who played as a midfielder. 

Spasić made his UEFA competition club debut on 10/08/95: Obilić 0–1 Dinamo Batumi in the European Cup Winners' Cup preliminary round. He also played twice in the UEFA Champions League with PAOK.He win cup in season 2000-2001 and 2002-2003.In his first season in Paok he scored 12 goals .In his last season he scored only 4 but have many assists. He left Paok and join AEL Larissa .He ended his career in Olympiakos Nicosia from Cyprus on July 1, 2008.

Honours

Club
PAOK
Greek Cup: 2000–01, 2002–03

External links

Footballtransfers.co.uk

1973 births
Living people
Serbian footballers
Serbian expatriate footballers
FK Dinamo Vranje players
FK Obilić players
FK Železnik players
Athlitiki Enosi Larissa F.C. players
Niki Volos F.C. players
Olympiakos Nicosia players
PAOK FC players
Super League Greece players
Cypriot First Division players
Expatriate footballers in Greece
Expatriate footballers in Cyprus
Sportspeople from Norrköping
Association football midfielders
Serbia and Montenegro expatriate sportspeople in Greece
Footballers from Östergötland County
Serbian expatriate sportspeople in Greece
Serbian expatriate sportspeople in Cyprus
Serbia and Montenegro expatriate footballers